Kick is a German and Dutch surname and a variant of Keck. Notable people with the name include:
 Darrell Kick (1968), American politician
 Murray Kick (1940), former Australian rules footballer
 Richard Kick (1947), retired German triple jumper
 Russ Kick, American writer
 Simon Kick (1603–1652), Dutch Golden Age painter

References 

German-language surnames
Dutch-language surnames
Surnames from nicknames